Osvalda Giardi (19 December 1932 – 1 July 2019) was an Italian high jumper and pentathlete.

She won 10 titles at the Italian national championship, and was ranked at number 25 on the IAAF world leading list in 1957, with 1.63 m established in Bologna on 14 September.

Biography
Osvalda Giardi had a twelve year long career, appearing 23 times for the Italian national team from 1954 to 1966.

National records
 High jump: 1.67 m ( Bergamo, 23 September 1962) - holder until 28 June 1969

National titles
8 wins in High jump (1954, 1956, 1957, 1958, 1960, 1962, 1964, 1966)
2 wins in Pentathlon (1956, 1964)

See also
 Women's high jump Italian record progression

References

External links
 

1932 births
2019 deaths
Italian female high jumpers
Italian female pentathletes
Sportspeople from Pisa
20th-century Italian women
21st-century Italian women